The ceremonial county of Berkshire (which is entirely made up of unitary authorities – Bracknell Forest, Reading, Slough, West Berkshire, Windsor and Maidenhead and Wokingham) is divided into eight parliamentary constituencies: two borough constituencies and six county constituencies.

Constituencies

2010 boundary review 
Under the Fifth Periodic Review of Westminster constituencies, the Boundary Commission for England decided to retain Berkshire's 8 constituencies for the 2010 election, making minor changes to realign constituency boundaries with the boundaries of current local government wards, and to reduce the electoral disparity between constituencies, including the transfer of Bray from Windsor to Maidenhead, Binfield from Bracknell to Windsor and the return of Foxborough ward from Windsor to Slough.

Proposed boundary changes
See 2023 Periodic Review of Westminster constituencies for further details.

Following the abandonment of the Sixth Periodic Review (the 2018 review), the Boundary Commission for England formally launched the 2023 Review on 5 January 2021. Initial proposals were published on 8 June 2021 and, following two periods of public consultation, revised proposals were published on 8 November 2022. Final proposals will be published by 1 July 2023.

The commission has proposed that Berkshire be combined with Hampshire and Surrey as a sub-region of the South East Region. As a result, Windsor now includes Englefield Green in the Surrey borough of Runnymede. The two Reading constituencies (East and West) would be abolished and revert to a single constituency, with two new constituencies created, named Earley and Woodley, and Mid Berkshire.

The following constituencies are proposed:

Containing electoral wards from Bracknell Forest

 Bracknell
 Maidenhead (part)

Containing electoral wards from Reading

 Earley and Woodley (part)
 Mid Berkshire (part)
 Reading

Containing electoral wards from Slough

 Slough
 Windsor (part)1

Containing electoral wards from West Berkshire

 Mid Berkshire (part)
 Newbury

Containing electoral wards from Windsor and Maidenhead

 Maidenhead (part)
 Windsor (part)1

Containing electoral wards from Wokingham

 Earley and Woodley (part)
 Wokingham

1also includes part in the Surrey borough of Runnymede

Results history
Primary data source: House of Commons research briefing - General election results from 1918 to 2019

2019 
The number of votes cast for each political party who fielded candidates in constituencies comprising Berkshire in the 2019 general election were as follows:

Percentage votes 
Note that before 1983 Berkshire additionally covered the southern part of what is now Oxfordshire, and the Eton and Slough areas which now form part of Berkshire were part of Buckinghamshire.

1pre-1979: Liberal Party; 1983 & 1987 - SDP-Liberal Alliance

* Included in Other

Accurate vote percentages for the 1918, 1931 and 1935 elections are unavailable because some candidates were elected unopposed.

Seats 

11983 & 1987 - SDP-Liberal Alliance

Maps

Historical representation by party

1885 to 1918

1918 to 1950

1950 to 1983

1983 to present

See also
 List of parliamentary constituencies in the South East (region)
History of parliamentary constituencies and boundaries in Berkshire

Notes

References

General

Specific

Government and politics of Slough
Berkshire
Politics of Berkshire
 
 
Parliamentary